In enzymology, a xyloglucan:xyloglucosyl transferase is an enzyme that catalyzes the chemical reaction in which a beta-(1,4) bond in the backbone of a xyloglucan in broken; the xyloglucanyl segment is then transferred to the O4 of the non-reducing terminal glucose residue of either xyloglucan or an oligosaccharide thereof.

This enzyme belongs to the family of glycosyltransferases, specifically the hexosyltransferases.  The systematic name of this enzyme class is xyloglucan:xyloglucan xyloglucanotransferase. Other names in common use include endo-xyloglucan transferase, and xyloglucan endotransglycosylase.

Structural studies

References

 
 
 
 

EC 2.4.1
Enzymes of known structure